Adrien Jules Jean Bonhoure (1860 - 1929) was a French governor of colonies of the French colonial empire, including Côte d'Ivoire, French Somaliland, Réunion, French India and French Polynesia. He was born in 1860 and died in 1929.

See also
Colonial heads of Côte d'Ivoire
List of colonial governors in 1900
List of colonial governors in 1901
List of colonial governors in 1902
List of colonial governors in 1903
List of colonial governors in 1904

References

1860 births
1920 deaths
French colonial governors and administrators
Governors of French Polynesia
Governors of French India
Governors of Réunion
People of French West Africa
Colonial Governors of French Somaliland
Colonial heads of Ivory Coast
People of the French Third Republic